Jogendranath Gupta (22 March 1883 – 31 May 1964) was an Indian historian, writer and editor of Bengali literature.

Career
Gupta was born in 1883 at Mulchar village, Bikrampur, Dhaka in British India. He did not complete his studies due to financial hardship, and started working at a zamindar's office. He wrote articles since he was a student. In his literary career he wrote and edited more than 100 books in Bengali.

Gupta edited a child encyclopedia named Shishubharati and Koisharak magazine. He is well known for the works on historical development of Bikrampur. Gupta wrote number of biographies, poetry, historical plays and novels.

Works

 Bikrampurer Itihas
 Bikrampurer Bibaran
 Bangalar Itihas
 Bharater Itihas
 Prithivir Itihas
 Bharat Mahila
 Banglar Dakat
 Dhruba
 Pralhat
 Bhimsen
 Himalay Avijaan

References

External links

1883 births
1965 deaths
Bengali historians
Bengali-language writers
Historians of India
People from Bikrampur
Bengali writers
Indian children's writers